Arvidsjaur is a locality and the seat of Arvidsjaur Municipality in Norrbotten County, province of Lapland, Sweden with 4,635 inhabitants in 2010.

Arvidsjaur is a center for the European car industry. During the winter months, major car-manufacturers perform arctic trials in the Arvidsjaur Municipality. The town also fosters tourism by offering snowmobile tours, trekking, skiing, fishing and dogsled rides.

Sport
The following sports clubs are in Arvidsjaur:

 IFK Arvidsjaur

Transport
Arvidsjaur has established rail and road networks, and also has an airport, with daily flights to Stockholm, and seasonal ones to destinations in Germany. The railway Inlandsbanan has only tourist trains in the summer. There are buses to Gällivare, Östersund, Skellefteå, Piteå, Luleå and more local places.

Climate
Arvidsjaur has a subarctic climate that is dominated by the long winters and briefly interrupted by moderately warm but very bright summers due to its northerly latitude.

See also
Skogssamer

References

External links 

 Arvidsjaur - Official site
 Arvidsjaur.eu  - Information about Arvidsjaur

Populated places in Arvidsjaur Municipality
Municipal seats of Norrbotten County
Swedish municipal seats
Lapland (Sweden)

se:Árviesjávrrie gielda